Lactophrys is a genus of boxfishes native to the western Atlantic Ocean. All trunkfish of the genus Lactophrys, secretes a colorless toxin from glands on its skin when touched. The toxin is only dangerous when ingested, so there is no immediate harm to divers. Predators however, as large as nurse sharks, can die as a result of eating a trunkfish.

Species
There are currently 3 recognized species in this genus:
Lactophrys bicaudalis (Linnaeus, 1758) (Spotted trunkfish)
Lactophrys trigonus (Linnaeus, 1758) (Buffalo trunkfish)
Lactophrys triqueter (Linnaeus, 1758) (Smooth trunkfish)

References

Ostraciidae
Ray-finned fish genera
Taxa named by William John Swainson